Report 51 (also known as Report 51: Alien Invasion) is a 2013 Italian found footage-science fiction horror film directed by Alessio Liguori.

Cast
Michela Bruni as Amber
Luca Guastini as James
Viola Graziosi as Linda
Damiano Martina as John
Ann Pierssens as Ann

Release
The film premiered at Trieste Science+Fiction Festival on 1 November 2013.

References

Bibliography

External links

2013 films
English-language Italian films
2013 horror films
2013 science fiction films
Italian science fiction thriller films
Italian science fiction horror films
Found footage films
Films directed by Alessio Liguori
2010s English-language films
2010s Italian films